The aortic sac or aortic bulb is a dilated structure in mammalian embryos, lined by endothelial cells and is the most distal part of the truncus arteriosus. It is the primordial vascular channel from which the aortic arches arise (and eventually the dorsal aortae) and is homologous to the ventral aorta of gill-bearing vertebrates. The aortic sac eventually forms right and left horns, which subsequently give rise to the brachiocephalic trunk and the proximal segment of the arch of aorta, respectively.

Genes HAND2 (dHAND) and HAND1 (eHAND) are expressed during the development of the aortic bulb and the arteries which arise from it. The protein encoded by these genes belong to the basic helix-loop-helix family of transcription factors.

References 

Cardiac anatomy
Embryology of cardiovascular system